Lake Shore Boulevard (often incorrectly compounded as Lakeshore Boulevard) is a major arterial road running along more than half of the Lake Ontario waterfront in the city of Toronto, Ontario, Canada. Prior to 1998, two segments of Lake Shore Boulevard (from the Etobicoke–Mississauga boundary to the Humber River and from Leslie Street to Woodbine Avenue) were designated as part of Highway 2, with the highway following the Gardiner Expressway between these two sections.

Lake Shore Boulevard's western terminus is Etobicoke Creek, the western boundary of Toronto. Its western section is a redesignation of the old Lakeshore Road, which still runs from Burlington to Mississauga. From here its route follows closely, though not always within sight of, the shoreline of Lake Ontario eastward through the city to Ashbridges Bay, where it curves north and becomes Woodbine Avenue at Woodbine Beach. The former route of Highway 2 briefly follows Woodbine then turns right onto Kingston Road east.

Route description

Etobicoke section
From the western city limit, Lake Shore Boulevard (designated Lake Shore Boulevard West), originally part of Lakeshore Road, is a four-lane arterial road through the neighbourhoods of Long Branch, New Toronto and Mimico. This section is lined with commercial and retail uses. The area furthest to the west was more industrial in character, which continues to be converted to other uses. As the street gets nearer to Humber Bay, the Mimico area becomes almost entirely residential and somewhat older as it was one of the first areas of cottage development for city dwellers. East of Park Lawn Road, the street is lined to the south with recently built condominium towers on the former stretch of motels known as "The Motel Strip". No motels now remain from the period when travelers would stay at motels here, which was then just outside the Toronto city limits.

Sunnyside/Exhibition section

It then crosses the Humber River and becomes a six-lane arterial road along Lake Ontario, offering vistas of the city and lake. The crossing contains an interchange with the Gardiner Expressway, and the eastbound lanes pass south of the highway, while the westbound lanes are routed to the north of the highway, rejoining the eastbound lanes east of Park Lawn. The splitting of the Lake Shore was done at the time of the expressway project, as new bridges were built to connect to the terminus of the Queen Elizabeth Way highway. The highway to the west has become part of the Gardiner, and the Lucky Lion monument which designated its start was relocated nearby to the south of the Lake Shore Boulevard, just east of the Humber.

From the Humber River to Bathurst Street, the roadway is built on land infilled into the lake. The section east of the Humber was infilled in the 1910-1920s and was part of the Sunnyside Amusement Park development, which the road travelled through. The section south of Exhibition Place was infilled in the 1950s, at the same time as the Gardiner Expressway project. The original shoreline is elevated along the north side of the street. The area east of the Exhibition was infilled earlier. The original shoreline is north of the Boulevard, and the Queen's Wharf lighthouse is on the north side of the street. The Sunnyside/Exhibition section has much open space with some development, including recreation facilities, such as Ontario Place, Sunnyside Bathing Pavilion, Palais Royale and the Boulevard Club.

Downtown section

In the downtown section, Lake Shore criss-crosses, runs parallel and underneath the elevated section of the Gardiner Expressway. It is designated Lake Shore Boulevard East east of Yonge Street. This section travels through the old rail lands and port district. The streets in this area predate the designation as Lake Shore Boulevard but were connected in the 1950s prior to being renamed in 1959. From Dan Leckie Way to Yonge Street, the south side of the street has been entirely converted to high-rise condominium development. West of Yonge, Lake Shore is one-way westbound, while eastbound traffic travels along Harbour Street. East of Yonge, Lake Shore is one single road under and alongside the Gardiner.

The 509 Harbourfront and 511 Bathurst streetcars serve the adjacent Fleet Street from Exhibition Place to Bathurst Street, but there are no regular service transit routes along Lake Shore in this area.

East of Don River
East of downtown, Lake Shore Boulevard continues as a six-lane arterial road to the Don Roadway, where it curves onto the former Keating Street and continues east to Woodbine Avenue, eventually becoming a four-lane arterial road. The Keating section is straight from Cherry Street to Woodbine. It is an older industrial area that is in transition in the western part. Housing and retail has been built along the road further to the east.

History 

Lake Shore Boulevard was constructed in sections; partly through the building of new roads east of the Humber River, partly through connecting existing roads. West of the Humber River, Lake Shore Boulevard was part of the old Provincial Highway. The road east of the Humber was built in sections, the first being a separate road parallel with Lakeshore Road, in conjunction with the development of the Sunnyside Amusement Park waterfront infill. Previously, the Lakeshore Road connected to Queen Street just west of today's St. Joseph's Health Centre. In the 1910s, an overpass over the waterfront rail lines was built to connect Queen Street to the Lakeshore Road at Roncesvalles Avenue. At the same time, Lake Shore Boulevard was extended as a four-lane roadway east to the Exhibition Place area.

In October 1954, the Lake Shore Boulevard bridge over the Humber was destroyed by debris floating downstream in the flooding caused by Hurricane Hazel. A two-lane bailey bridge was quickly put in place and used for several months. A bus shuttled TTC passengers across the bridge as the streetcar line from downtown to Long Branch was severed. The original bridge was repaired and used until new bridges were built as part of the Gardiner Expressway project.

In the 1950s, as part of the Gardiner project, Lake Shore Boulevard east of the Humber was doubled in width by widening into the right of way of Lakeshore Road, replacing it, which resulted in the demolition of the rail overpass leading to the Queen/Roncesvalles intersection by 1960. East of Sunnyside, a six-lane road was constructed to the area of Bathurst and Fleet Streets. Lake Shore Boulevard in the downtown was built to connect Fleet and Harbour Streets and was a service road for the Gardiner. East of downtown, Keating Street was built east to Woodbine as part of the project. When the Gardiner was completed to the Don River, Lake Shore Boulevard was re-routed to Keating and the Keating Street section was renamed Lake Shore Boulevard.

Spelling 

Lake Shore Boulevard is commonly compounded as Lakeshore Boulevard. Many traffic signs, transit shelters and other signs contradict each other, sometimes on the same corner, as illustrated in the photograph. According to the official bylaws that designated the road, the correct format is "Lake Shore Boulevard". This mistake is likely due to confusion with Lakeshore Road to the west, where the single word format is actually correct.

Public transit

In Etobicoke, from just east of the Etobicoke Creek (Long Branch Loop) to the Humber River (Humber Loop), the street is served by the western leg of the Toronto Transit Commission's 501 Queen streetcar route. The 507 Long Branch and 508 Lake Shore used to run along Lake Shore until the 507 route was discontinued in 1995 and merged into the 501, and the 508 was discontinued altogether in 2015 but reinstated in 2019. In addition to the 501 streetcar, the 110B limited service branch of the Islington South bus route runs along the street between Long Branch Loop and 30th Street. 

There is no full transit service along the street in Old Toronto because of its historic status as a Highway 2 bypass of busy city streets and its present status as an alternative to the Gardiner Expressway. However, there is a limited service bus route, the 145 Downtown / Humber Bay Express Eastbound, an extra-fare Downtown Express route that runs between Kipling Avenue in Etobicoke, where it overlaps with the 501 streetcar line, and Bathurst Street, where it turns off to serve the downtown core. One of only two regular services, the 80 Queensway bus travels along Lake Shore between Ellis Avenue and Parkside Drive. The only other regular service route along Lake Shore in Old Toronto is the 92 Woodbine South, which runs a very short distance along it at its eastern terminus near Woodbine Beach, where it defaults north onto Woodbine Avenue.

Landmarks

See also
 Queens Quay (Toronto) - actual lakeside road from Bathurst Street east to Parliament Street
 Front Street (Toronto) - former lakeside road until infill of harbour during the late 19th century.

References 

Roads in Toronto
Etobicoke
Boulevards